The Benefits Agency (BA), a now defunct UK government welfare department, was an executive agency of the United Kingdom Department of Social Security (subsequently the Department for Work and Pensions) which was set up in 1991 to "help create and deliver an active modern social security service, which encourages and enables independence and aims to pay the right money at the right time". The BA was merged with the Employment Service in April 2001 to form Jobcentre Plus.

References 

Pensions in the United Kingdom
Defunct executive agencies of the United Kingdom government
1991 establishments in the United Kingdom
Employment agencies of the United Kingdom